Matthias Corwin (February 19, 1761 – September 4, 1829) was an American politician. Born in Morris County, New Jersey, Corwin and his family moved to Ohio in 1798. Corwin served in the Ohio House of Representatives and served as speaker. His son was US Senator, Ohio Governor and US Secretary of the Treasury Thomas Corwin. Corwin died in Lebanon, Ohio. He was a Presidential elector in 1812 for the James Madison ticket.

Notes

References

1761 births
1829 deaths
People from Morris County, New Jersey
People from Lebanon, Ohio
Speakers of the Ohio House of Representatives
1812 United States presidential electors
Members of the Ohio House of Representatives